Tamás Szántó (born 18 February 1996) is a Hungarian former professional footballer who played as an attacking midfielder.

Club career

Early years
Szántó was born in Sopron while his father Csaba played for FC Sopron. His family is Székely from Târgu Mureș, Romania. He started to play football at the youth academy of FC Sopron before joining the youth academy of Rapid Wien in 2010.

Rapid Wien
Szántó made his Austrian Bundesliga debut on 31 July 2016, replacing Arnór Ingvi Traustason in the 63rd minute against Altach. His first appearance in the starting lineup came on 7 August 2016 against Austria Wien on Wiener Derby. Szántó scored his first league goal on 10 September 2016 against Sturm Graz in the 54th minute; that match ended in a 1–1 draw. He finished the 2016–17 season with total of 5 goals and 2 assists in 29 league appearances. His second season at Rapid was plagued by injuries, which limited his appearances and playing time.

Retirement
In April 2021, Szántó announced his retirement from playing at the age of 25 due to injury problems.

International career
Szántó was named in Hungarian U-20 provisional squad for 2015 FIFA U-20 World Cup but was cut from the final squad. On 10 October 2016, he played his first match for the Hungary U-21 team.

Career statistics

Club

International

References

External links
Profile at SK Rapid Wien Official Website  

1996 births
Living people
People from Sopron
Hungarian footballers
Association football midfielders
SK Rapid Wien players
Austrian Football Bundesliga players
Sportspeople from Győr-Moson-Sopron County